The Fédération française de parachutisme (FFP or French Parachuting Federation) is the main parachuting organisation in France.

History
It was formed on 10 December 1949 as the Fédération nationale des parachutistes français.

Structure
In its register it has 270 parachuting groups and 42 parachuting schools.

See also
 British Skydiving, formerly known as the British Parachute Association

References

External links
 FFP

1949 establishments in France
Aviation organizations based in France
Parachuting in France
Parachuting organizations
Parachute
Sports organizations established in 1949